The 500 meters distance for women in the 2012–13 ISU Speed Skating World Cup was contested over 12 races on six occasions, out of a total of nine World Cup occasions for the season, with the first occasion taking place in Heerenveen, Netherlands, on 16–18 November 2012, and the final occasion also taking place in Heerenveen on 8–10 March 2013.

On Sunday, 20 January 2013, in the Calgary competitions, South Korean Lee Sang-hwa set a new world record of 36.80 seconds.

Lee Sang-hwa went on to win the cup, while Jenny Wolf of Germany came second, and Wang Beixing of China came third. The defending champion, Yu Jing of China, ended up in 10th place.

Top three

Race medallists

Standings 
Standings as of 10 March 2013 (end of the season).

References 

Women 0500
ISU